Teaberry may refer to:

 Teaberry, Kentucky, United States, an unincorporated community
 Teaberry, West Virginia, United States, an unincorporated community
 , a World War II net laying ship
 Connie Teaberry (born 1970), American high jumper
 Clark's Teaberry, a brand of chewing gum

See also
 Gaultheria procumbens, a North American plant species also known as the eastern teaberry
 Myrteola nummularia, a South American plant species known as teaberry